The 2023 FIFA Women's World Cup is a football tournament scheduled to take place in July and August 2023 involving 32 women's national teams from nations affiliated to the International Federation of Association Football (FIFA). The tournament will be broadcast all over the world.

Note that some countries may not have yet finalised broadcast deals for the tournament.

Broadcaster

References

Broadcasting rights
FIFA Women's World Cup broadcasting rights